The Fairport Harbor West Breakwater Light, on Lake Erie, located near the end of the west breakwater at the mouth of the Grand River was built in 1925, replacing the Grand River (Fairport Harbor) Light, which still stands and is now a marine museum.

The light is automated and closed to the public.  However, it is possible to walk out along the breakwater to view the structure and grounds. It was added to the National Register of Historic Places in 1992.

In 2006, an effort began by a group of community activists to take ownership of the lighthouse with the goal of preserving the facility for future generations.  The United States Coast Guard will continue to maintain the light and foghorn as a navigational aid.

In September 2009, the United States General Services Administration put the lighthouse up for public auction via an online auction.

Sources

References

Further reading
Harrison, Timothy, The lights and Lost Lights of Fairport Harbor, (October, 2001)   Lighthouse Digest.
 Oleszewski, Wes. Great Lakes Lighthouses, American and Canadian: A Comprehensive Directory/Guide to Great Lakes Lighthouses, (Gwinn, Michigan: Avery Color Studios, Inc., 1998) .
 U.S. Coast Guard. Historically Famous Lighthouses (Washington, D.C.: Government Printing Office, 1957).
 Wright, Larry and Wright, Patricia. Great Lakes Lighthouses Encyclopedia Hardback (Erin: Boston Mills Press, 2006)

External links 

 Fairport Harbor West Breakwater Lighthouse (maintained by the current owner)
 FairportLights
 Anderson, Kraig, Lighthouse Friends
 Lighthouse Depot

Transportation buildings and structures in Lake County, Ohio
National Register of Historic Places in Lake County, Ohio
Lighthouses on the National Register of Historic Places in Ohio
Lighthouses completed in 1925
Houses completed in 1925